James Head Winford (October 9, 1909 – December 16, 1970) nicknamed "Cowboy", was a professional baseball pitcher. He played all or part of six seasons in Major League Baseball between 1932 and 1938 for the St. Louis Cardinals and the Brooklyn Dodgers.

Born in Shelbyville, Tennessee, Winford died on December 16, 1970 in Miami, Oklahoma.

References

External links

Major League Baseball pitchers
St. Louis Cardinals players
Brooklyn Dodgers players
Scottdale Scotties players
St. Joseph Saints players
Shawnee Robins players
Scottdale Cardinals players
Columbus Red Birds players
Greensboro Patriots players
Springfield Red Wings players
Bartlesville Broncos players
Houston Buffaloes players
Nashville Vols players
Montreal Royals players
New Orleans Pelicans (baseball) players
Sacramento Solons players
Batesville Pilots players
Oklahoma City Indians players
Baseball players from Tennessee
People from Shelbyville, Tennessee
1909 births
1970 deaths